The Waihora River is a river of the Gisborne Region of New Zealand's North Island. It flows generally west from its sources in rough hill country southwest of Tolaga Bay to reach the Waipaoa River at Te Karaka.

See also
List of rivers of New Zealand

References

Rivers of the Gisborne District
Rivers of New Zealand